Monothecium is a genus of flowering plants belonging to the family Acanthaceae.

Its native range is Central African Republic to Eritrea and Angola, India, and Sri Lanka.

Species
Species:

Monothecium aristatum 
Monothecium glandulosum 
Monothecium leucopterum

References

Acanthaceae
Acanthaceae genera